Samuel Marx (1867 – November 30, 1922) was an American auctioneer and politician from New York.

Born in New York City, Marx was educated in the public schools and became an auctioneer and appraiser. In 1889, he married Irene Smith.

He was a member of Tammany Hall and served on the New York City Council. In August 1919, he was appointed Internal Revenue Collector for the 3rd New York District. In November 1922, Marx was elected as a Democrat to the United States House of Representatives in the 19th District, but died before his term began.

Samuel Marx Triangle, a small street-corner park in Manhattan, is named for him.

See also
List of members-elect of the United States House of Representatives who never took their seats

References

Sources
Samuel Marx Dies, Congressman-Elect in NYT on December 1, 1922

1867 births
1922 deaths
20th-century American politicians
American auctioneers
Elected officials who died without taking their seats
New York (state) Democrats
New York City Council members